

See also 
 United States House of Representatives elections, 1796 and 1797
 List of United States representatives from North Carolina

References 

1796
North Carolina
United States House of Representatives